Teleiodes albiluculella is a moth of the family Gelechiidae. It is found on Crete.

The wingspan is 9–11 mm. The forewings are white, mottled with yellowish and black (especially in the apical part), and with distinct black markings. There are costal spots on the costa at the base, at one-third and two-thirds, as well as a distinct, oblique black spot near the base in the middle of the wing. The tornal spot is prominent. The hindwings are dark grey, darkest towards apex. Adults have been recorded on wing in late June.

Etymology
The species name refers to the moderately close relationship with Teleiodes luculella.

References

Moths described in 2001
Teleiodes
Moths of Europe